Jennifer Eunice Muñoz Sandoval (born 31 December 1993) is a footballer who plays as a defender. Born in the United States, she represented  Guatemala at the international level.

College career
Costa Mesa, California-based Muñoz began her college career in 2012, being a defender and forward for the Golden West Rustlers. As a freshman, she played 14 matches, scored 2 goals and made 1 assist. Next season, as a sophomore, she transitioned definitely into a forward and improved her performance, playing 21 matches, scoring 10 goals and making 6 assists. 

In 2014, Muñoz moved to the Martin Methodist RedHawks, where she began to play as a midfielder (besides forward). Like her stint at Golden West College, her second year at Martin Methodist was better than the first. While as a junior she scored 4 goals and made two assists in 21 matches, as a senior she scored 21 goals (being the team top goalscorer) and made 8 assists in 20 matches. She finished her college career as a player in late 2015, but continued in the RedHawks as a volunteer assistant during the 2016 season.

Club career
Muñoz played for United Women's Soccer team FC Indiana in 2017. She signed with Puerto Rico Sol in July 2018. There, she was reassigned as a defender.

International career
Muñoz qualifies to play for Guatemala through descent. She capped during the 2016 CONCACAF Women's Olympic Qualifying Championship.

References

1993 births
Living people
American people of Guatemalan descent
American sportspeople of North American descent
Sportspeople of Guatemalan descent
People with acquired Guatemalan citizenship
Guatemalan women's footballers
Soccer players from California
People from Costa Mesa, California
Women's association football utility players
Golden West Rustlers women's soccer players
UT Southern FireHawks women's soccer players
F.C. Indiana players
Guatemala women's international footballers
Guatemalan expatriate footballers
Expatriate women's soccer players in the United States
Guatemalan expatriate sportspeople in the United States
Expatriate women's footballers in Puerto Rico